The Atlantic Canada Aviation Museum is an aerospace museum located in Halifax, Nova Scotia, Canada near the Halifax Stanfield International Airport.

History
The museum was established in 1977 by a group of volunteers. It opened to the public in 1985 and was granted "Local Museum" status by the Government of Nova Scotia in 1989. A 14,000 square foot hangar was built in 1995. In 1997, the museum recovered a TBM Avenger that crashed on while performing aerial spraying in 1975.

Exhibits
The museum features a number of exhibits that include CP-107 and Link trainers, a model of Halifax Civic Airport, and an original V-1 flying bomb.

Aircraft on display

 AEA Silver Dart – replica
 American Champion Citabria
 Avro Canada CF-100 Canuck
 Bell 47J-2 Ranger
 Bell 206
 Canadair CF-5A Freedom Fighter
 Canadair CF-104 Starfighter
 Canadair CT-133 Silver Star
 Canadair Sabre Mk.5
 Cessna L-19 Bird Dog
 Consolidated PBY-5A Catalina – under restoration
 de Havilland Canada CP-121 Tracker
 Ercoupe 415-C
 General Motors TBM Avenger
 Lincoln Sport Biplane
 Lockheed Jetstar
 McDonnell CF-101 Voodoo
 Piper PA-38 Tomahawk
 Pitts S-1C Special
 RotorWay Exec
 Scamp 1
 Scheibe L-Spatz 55

See also
 List of aerospace museums
Organization of Military Museums of Canada
Military history of Canada

References

External links 
 
 Atlantic Canada Aviation Museum News

Aviation history of Canada
Aerospace museums in Nova Scotia
Museums in Halifax, Nova Scotia